Rasova River may refer to:

 Valea Rasovei, a tributary of the Danube in Constanța County, Romania
 Rasova (Jaleș), a tributary of the Jaleș in Gorj County, Romania